The St. Louis Terriers were a baseball club that played in the short-lived Federal League in  and . They played their home games at Handlan's Park. The team was owned by ice magnate Phil Ball, who later was owner of the St. Louis Browns.

In their inaugural season, the Terriers posted a 62–89 record (.411) and finished in last place, 25 games behind the league champion Indianapolis Hoosiers. The team improved significantly the next year as they were pennant contenders until the last game of the season. The Terriers had an 87–67 mark (.565), ending up in second place,  of a percentage point behind the champion Chicago Whales, who finished 86–66 (.566).

Notable players
Among the St. Louis Terriers players who had experience (or would gain experience) in the American and/or National Leagues were Dave Davenport, Al Bridwell, Mordecai Brown, Doc Crandall, Grover Hartley, Ward Miller, Bob Groom, Fielder Jones, Eddie Plank, Jack Tobin and Ed Willett.

Baseball Hall of Famers

See also
1914 St. Louis Terriers season
1915 St. Louis Terriers season
St. Louis Terriers all-time roster

References

External links
Baseball Almanac
Federal League Teams

 
Baseball teams established in 1914
Baseball teams disestablished in 1915
1914 establishments in Missouri
1915 disestablishments in Missouri
Federal League teams
Defunct Major League Baseball teams
Defunct baseball teams in Missouri